The Stephens Creek Dam is an earth-filled embankment dam built on a rock foundation with an uncontrolled spillway across the Stephens Creek, located in the Far West region of New South Wales, Australia. The impounded  reservoir is called Stephens Creek Reservoir.

Location and features
The dam was completed in 1892 by the Broken Hill Water Supply Company to provide a continuing water source for drought-ridden Broken Hill. The reservoir soon became inadequate and a further reservoir, Umberumberka, was built to add to the water supply. Stephens Creek Reservoir remains the primary water source for Broken Hill, a city of around  people and is a popular picnic area.

The facility is owned and operated by Essential Energy, which, prior to 2004 was Australian Inland Energy and Water.

See also

 List of reservoirs and dams in New South Wales

References

Dams in New South Wales
Broken Hill, New South Wales
Embankment dams
Earth-filled dams
Dams completed in 1892